Max Deutsch (17 November 1892 – 22 November 1982) was an Austrian-French composer, conductor, and academic teacher. He studied with Arnold Schönberg and was his assistant. Teaching at the Sorbonne and the École Normale de Musique de Paris, he influenced notable students such as Philippe Capdenat, Donald Harris, György Kurtág and Philippe Manoury.

Career 
Born in Vienna, Deutsch was a pupil of and assistant to Arnold Schoenberg. He studied under him in Vienna before the First World War; and followed Schönberg as his assistant to Amsterdam in 1921.  Deutsch was a Fellow and taught at UNESCO, and taught at the Sorbonne (Paris IV) from 1970 to 1971, and finally, from 1972 to the École Normale de Musique de Paris.

He founded in Paris the theater  (The Jewish Mirror), where many works of composers such as Schönberg, Anton Webern and Alban Berg were first performed.

Konstantin Stanislavsky commissioned a work which was to become the opera  (Chess). His "film symphony"  (The Treasure) came from a commission from German film director Georg Wilhelm Pabst to provide an original musical score for his 1923 film.  In structure,  was crafted in two formats: a film score and a stand-alone symphonic work.  The five act symphony survived because the manuscript in the latter form was donated to the Deutsches Filminstitut in 1982, shortly before Deutsch died.  A score of years later, DeutschlandRadio Berlin collaborated with the Staatsphilharmonie Rheinland-Pfalz, conducted by Frank Strobel, to produce a record of "this extremely rare and totally unknown symphonic work". The recording became the foundation of a "synchronized restoration" of the film.  As film music the "piece is scored for a theater orchestra of the kind typically found in European cinemas of the day".  It brings to mind the work of Kurt Weill and Stefan Wolpe, and foreshadows Max Steiner's modernist film scores, adopting expressionist atonal twelve tone leitmotifs.  Mood setting and character are developed; pianos appear throughout.

From 1940 to 1945, Deutsch served in the French Foreign Legion. He formed long lasting friendships with Georges Bernanos and Jean Cassou.  He was close to Tristan Tzara, Jean Cocteau and Vladimir Jankelevitch. Max Deutsch was a friend of Ferruccio Busoni. He died in Paris.

After the Second World War, he devoted himself mainly to teaching music, chiefly following the principles of Schönberg. In Paris, among his hundreds of students, there were composers: Jorge Arriagada, Girolamo Arrigo, Colette Bailly, Sylvano Bussotti, Philippe Capdenat, Gérard Condé, Ahmed Essyad, Jacqueline Fontyn, Sylvia Hallett, Donald Harris, Félix Ibarrondo, György Kurtág, Philippe Manoury, Patrick Marcland, Luis de Pablo, Yves-Marie Pasquet, Kyriakos Sfetsas, Raymond Vaillant; American composers David Chaitkin, Edmund Cionek, Eugene Kurtz, Allen Shearer, and Dean C. Taylor; British composer Nicholas Maw; Canadian-born Srul Irving Glick; Italian Sylvano Bussotti; the conductor Alexandre Myrat; and music critic Heinz-Klaus Metzger.

Family
A love of music and music theory ran in the family.  His brother was Frederick Dorian (1902-1991).  Frederick's name metamorphosed from Friederich Deutsch before he became a naturalized American.  Both Deutsch brothers studied under Schönberg in Vienna.  Frederick too was a master of music and learned the subject from a number of other sources.  Frederick was taught musicology by Guido Adler.  He earned a PhD in 1924 with his thesis, "Fugue in the works of Beethoven" (""). Eduard Steuermann taught him piano. Anton Webern taught him how to conduct and music theory.  He spent a four-year stint, beginning in 1930, as a music critic which was capped by a year as a correspondent of the Frankfurter Zeitung in Paris.  Thereafter he became a Carnegie-Mellon University music professor.

Legacy
Before he died, Deutsch attempted to destroy all of his compositions, so that his only surviving legacy would be his students. However, some of his work survived.

In late 2013, a recording of Deutsch conducting the Suisse Romande Orchestra in a performance of three "master works" by Arnold Schoenberg was released.  It includes short lectures by Deutsch on each of the pieces.

Works
 , opera (1923)
 , revue (Moulin Rouge) and film music for Georg Wilhelm Pabsts (1923) 
  (1925)
 , opera (1972)
 The Flight, incidental music for the play Tristan Tzara
 Prayer for us carnal, choral symphony with a text by Charles Peguy
 Choirs of men from Vinci

See also

References

Notes

Citations

Sources

External links

Max Deutsch photograph

Austrian conductors (music)
Male conductors (music)
French male conductors (music)
Austrian male composers
French male composers
1892 births
1982 deaths
20th-century Austrian people
Pupils of Arnold Schoenberg
20th-century Austrian Jews
Soldiers of the French Foreign Legion
Musicians from Vienna
Academic staff of the École Normale de Musique de Paris
20th-century Austrian musicians
20th-century Austrian male musicians
20th-century French composers
20th-century French conductors (music)
20th-century French male musicians
Austrian emigrants to France